The  is a Bo′Bo′+Bo′Bo′ wheel arrangement multi-voltage AC two-unit electric locomotive type operated by Japan Freight Railway Company (JR Freight) in Japan hauling freight trains on the Kaikyō Line through the Seikan Tunnel separating mainland Honshu with the northern island of Hokkaido. A prototype locomotive was delivered in January 2013 for evaluation and testing, with full-production locomotives delivered from June 2014, entering service from July 2014.

Background
In order to allow Hokkaido Shinkansen services to operate through the dual-gauge Seikan Tunnel (which commenced on 26 March 2016), the overhead line system voltage was raised from the narrow gauge standard of 20 kV AC to the standard shinkansen power supply of 25 kV AC. A fleet of approximately 20 new dual-voltage locomotives capable of operating under either 20 kV or 25 kV was therefore required to replace the Class ED79 and Class EH500 locomotives previously used to haul freight and overnight sleeping car services through the tunnel. These locomotives are also compatible with the digital ATC and feature digital train wireless communications. The total cost of manufacturing the fleet of locomotives together with construction of new maintenance depot facilities was approximately 19 billion yen.

Design
The Bo′Bo′+Bo′Bo′ wheel arrangement locomotives are painted in an all-over red livery with a white bodyside line and silver wavy line.

Operations
The locomotives operate between Higashi-Aomori Freight Terminal and Goryōkaku Freight Terminal via the Kaikyō Line and Seikan Tunnel.

History

Design of the prototype locomotive, EH800-901, began in fiscal 2010, and the completed locomotive was unveiled to the press at the Toshiba factory in Fuchū, Tokyo, on 27 November 2012. It was delivered to JR Freight in Sendai in January 2013. Following delivery, the prototype locomotive was tested within the confines of Higashi-Fukushima Station before being moved to Goryōkaku Depot in Hokkaido for testing in winter conditions.

The first full-production locomotive was delivered in June 2014. This entered revenue service on 16 July 2014.

Fleet list

, 20 Class EH800 locomotives are in service.

Classification

The EH800 classification for this locomotive type is explained below. As with previous locomotive designs, the prototype is numbered EH800-901, with subsequent production locomotives numbered from EH800-1 onward.
 E: Electric locomotive
 H: Eight driving axles
 800: AC locomotive with AC motors

See also
 Train on Train, a piggy-back concept for transporting freight through the Seikan Tunnel at higher speeds

References

Further reading

External links

 Toshiba press release (27 November 2012) 

Electric locomotives of Japan
EH800
Railway locomotives introduced in 2013
Toshiba locomotives
20 kV AC locomotives
25 kV AC locomotives
1067 mm gauge locomotives of Japan
Bo′Bo′+Bo′Bo′ locomotives
Multi-system locomotives